The 2020 TCR Asia Series season was set to be the sixth season of the TCR Asia Series.

Race calendar 
The provisional 2020 schedule was announced on 26 November 2019, with five events scheduled. Due to the COVID-19 pandemic in Asia, the TCR Asia Series was to be split into two seasons, TCR Asia North and Asia South which was also cancelled.

Teams and drivers

References

External links 
 

TCR Asia Series
TCR Asia Series
Asia Series